was a Japanese volleyball player who competed in the 1964 Summer Olympics and in the 1968 Summer Olympics.

He was born in Saga Prefecture.

In 1964 he was part of the Japanese team which won the bronze medal in the Olympic tournament. He played all nine matches.

Four years later he was a squad member of the Japanese team which won the silver medal in the 1968 Olympic tournament.

He died from lymphoma.

References

External links
 profile

1940 births
2021 deaths
Japanese men's volleyball players
Olympic volleyball players of Japan
Volleyball players at the 1964 Summer Olympics
Volleyball players at the 1968 Summer Olympics
Olympic silver medalists for Japan
Olympic bronze medalists for Japan
Olympic medalists in volleyball
Asian Games medalists in volleyball
Volleyball players at the 1966 Asian Games
Medalists at the 1966 Asian Games
Asian Games gold medalists for Japan
Medalists at the 1968 Summer Olympics
Medalists at the 1964 Summer Olympics
Deaths from lymphoma
20th-century Japanese people